In the 2020–21 season, Espérance Sportive de Tunis competed in the Ligue 1 for the 66th season, as well as the Tunisian Cup.  It was their 66th consecutive season in the top flight of Tunisian football. They competed in Ligue 1, the Champions League and the Tunisian Cup.

Squad list
Players and squad numbers last updated on 18 September 2020.Note: Flags indicate national team as has been defined under FIFA eligibility rules. Players may hold more than one non-FIFA nationality.

Pre-season

Competitions

Overview

{| class="wikitable" style="text-align: center"
|-
!rowspan=2|Competition
!colspan=8|Record
!rowspan=2|Started round
!rowspan=2|Final position / round
!rowspan=2|First match
!rowspan=2|Last match
|-
!
!
!
!
!
!
!
!
|-
| Ligue 1

| 
| style="background:gold;"| Winners
| 6 December 2020
| 19 May 2021
|-
| Tunisian Cup

| colspan=2| Round of 32
| colspan=2| 26 May 2021
|-
| Champions League

| First round
| Semi-finals
| 23 December 2020
| 29 June 2021
|-
! Total

Ligue 1

League table

Results summary

Results by round

Matches

Tunisian Cup

Champions League

First round

Group stage

Group D

Knockout stage

Squad information

Playing statistics

|-

|-
! colspan=14 style=background:#dcdcdc; text-align:center| Players transferred out during the season

Goalscorers
Includes all competitive matches. The list is sorted alphabetically by surname when total goals are equal.

Transfers

In

Out

Notes

References

2020-21
Tunisian football clubs 2020–21 season
2020–21 CAF Champions League participants seasons